Kevin Klein is a politician in Manitoba, Canada.  He was elected to the Legislative Assembly of Manitoba in the 2022 Kirkfield Park provincial by-election, for the electoral division of Kirkfield Park. Klein is a member of the Progressive Conservative Party.

Previously, Klein served as a Winnipeg City Councillor, serving as the Councillor for Charleswood-Tuxedo-Westwood from 2018 to 2022. Klein also ran in the 2022 Winnipeg mayoral election, placing third.

Electoral results

2022 Winnipeg mayoral election

References

Living people
Progressive Conservative Party of Manitoba MLAs
Winnipeg city councillors
21st-century Canadian politicians
Year of birth missing (living people)